E is a 2006 Indian Tamil-language medical thriller film directed by S. P. Jananathan. The film stars Jiiva and Nayanthara, while Ashish Vidyarthi, Pasupathy and Karunas played supporting roles. The film's music is composed by director Srikanth Deva. The film was appreciated for its fresh storyline connecting to real-life medical crimes. The movie was a commercial failure, garnering mixed critical response.

Plot 
The movie revolves around Easwaran alias E, an orphan brought up in the musty, teeming slums of Chennai by an old woman. For him, money is God. He comes across Jothy, a bar dancer who settles down in the same locality. After a few encounters, they get acquainted with each other. E's simple ways attract Jothy. Coming to know of E's past, Jothy tries desperately to correct his ways and set him on the right path. Meanwhile, Dr. Ramakrishnan takes up the task of testing a medicine devised by a foreign company, which may come handy in killing people in thousands, especially during times of war. Ramakrishnan chooses Jothy's sister and E's grandmother as specimens for the test. He cashes in on the ignorance to slum dwellers. Things take a turn when E rescues Ramakrishnan from a murder bid by Nellai Mani. A sequence of events brings Nellai Mani and E together. Without knowing Nellai Mani's motive, E hides him in a secret place and decides to hand him over to Ramakrishnan for a huge sum. Slowly, E gets attracted by Nellai Mani's good ways. Through him, E discovers Ramakrishnan's ulterior motives. Nellai Mani, a revolutionary fighting for a cause, tries to bring about a change in E's heart. Succeeding in his attempt, Nellai Mani lays down his life, leaving E to complete his task. The rest is all about how E puts an end to Ramakrishnan and his evil ways.

Cast 

 Jiiva as Easwaran (E)
 Nayanthara as Jothy
 Ashish Vidyarthi as Dr. Ramakrishnan
 Pasupathy as Nellai Mani
 Karunas as Tony
 Chaams as Ganeshan
 Rajesh
 Ajay Rathnam as Police Officer
 Cheranraj as Police Officer
 Suruli Manohar as Police Inspector
 Sabitha Anand
 Aryan
 Scissor Manohar
 Dinesh as Parthiban
 Vichu
 Laksha as Nurse Lilly
 Sana Khan as an item number

Soundtrack 
The music was composed by Srikanth Deva and released by Star Music. Rediff called it "poor music".

Reception 
Behindwoods wrote "The plot seems to be out of the world for an Indian movie, but Jananadhan manages his best to do justice to the movie. Power packed with some amazing performances by Jeeva, Pasupathy, Ashish Vidhyarthi, and Nayantara, E is definitely worth the money that is spent on the tickets". Sify wrote "On the downside the film lacks entertainment and the second half drags".

References

External links 
 

2006 films
2000s Tamil-language films
Films scored by Srikanth Deva
Medical-themed films
2000s science fiction thriller films
Indian science fiction thriller films
Films directed by S. P. Jananathan